Bardoux may refer to:

People with the surname
Agénor Bardoux (1829-1897), French politician.
Jacques Bardoux (1874-1959), French politician.

Locations
Saint-Bardoux, small town in France.